Riel may refer to:

Places
Riel, Netherlands, a town in the Netherlands
Riel (electoral district), a provincial electoral district in Manitoba, Canada, named after Louis Riel
Riel, Winnipeg, a community committee comprising three city wards

People with the surname
Alex Riel (born 1940), Danish jazz and rock drummer
André Riel (born 1989), Danish professional footballer
Ane Riel (born 1971), Danish novelist
Cole Riel (born 1995), American politician
Etta Riel (1914–???), American woman who disappeared
Heike Riel (born 1971), German nanotechnologist
Hervé Riel, 17th century French fisherman, subject of poem by Robert Browning
Jørn Riel (born 1931), Danish writer
Louis Riel Sr. (1817–1864), Canadian Métis farmer, father of Louis Riel
Louis Riel (1844–1885), Canadian Métis politician and rebel 
Maurice Riel (1922–2007), Canadian politician
Sara Riel (1848–1883), Canadian Métis nun, sister of Louis Riel

People with the given name
John Riel Casimero (born 1989), Filipino boxer and internet personality
Lawrence Riel Yew (1942–1998), Canadian trapper, fisherman and politician
Riel de Kock (born 1983), South African cricketer
Riel Nason, Canadian novelist

Other uses
Cambodian riel, the currency of Cambodia
Metro Riel, proposed metro line in Guatemala City, Guatemala
Prix Riel, Franco-Manitoban award
Riel (film), a 1979 film about Louis Riel
Riel House, museum and former residence of Louis Riel

See also
Van Riel
Louis Riel (disambiguation)
Riel Rebellion (disambiguation)
Riehl (disambiguation)
Rial (disambiguation)